Auksi is a village in Viljandi Parish, Viljandi County, Estonia. It has a population of 60 (as of 1 January 2010).

See also
Lake Auksi

References

Villages in Viljandi County